Xylariopsis mimica is a species of beetle in the family Cerambycidae. It was described by Bates in 1884. It is known from China, Russia, and Japan.

References

Apomecynini
Beetles described in 1884